Serhiy Tkachuk or Sergey Tkachuk (born 15 February 1992) is a professional Ukrainian-born Kazakhstani football goalkeeper.

Career

Club
Tkachuk is the product of FC Dynamo Kyiv sportive system and become to attend the football school at age 7.

On 2 February 2016, Tkachuk left FC Kairat.

Personal life
During the winter of 2012 Tkachuk accepted the citizenship of Kazakhstan.

Honours

Club
 FC Kairat
 Kazakhstan Cup (1): 2014

References

External links 

1992 births
Living people
Footballers from Kyiv
Kazakhstani footballers
Ukrainian footballers
Kazakhstan under-21 international footballers
Association football goalkeepers
Kazakhstan Premier League players
FC Nyva Ternopil players
FC Shakhter Karagandy players
FC Kairat players
FC Akzhayik players